

The Andreasson BA-11 was an acrobatic biplane designed for homebuilding. The design was based on that of the BA-4B, but the BA-11 added a second cockpit in tandem with the pilot's, and a more powerful engine.

Specifications

See also

References
 
 Andreasson BA-4, BA-4B och BA-11

1970s Swedish sport aircraft
Biplanes
Single-engined tractor aircraft
Aircraft first flown in 1977